Hsieh Su-wei and Peng Shuai were the defending champions, but Peng chose not to participate this year. Hsieh played alongside Flavia Pennetta, but lost in the quarterfinals to Andrea Hlaváčková and Lucie Hradecká.

Bethanie Mattek-Sands and Lucie Šafářová won their second consecutive Grand Slam title, defeating Casey Dellacqua and Yaroslava Shvedova in the final, 3–6, 6–4, 6–2.

Seeds

Draw

Finals

Top half

Section 1

Section 2

Bottom half

Section 3

Section 4

References
 Draw
2015 French Open – Women's draws and results at the International Tennis Federation

Women's Doubles
French Open - Women's Doubles
French Open by year – Women's doubles
2015 in French women's sport